Ken Booth may refer to:

 Ken Booth (academic) (born 1943), British international relations theorist
 Ken Booth (footballer) (1934–2015), English footballer
 Ken Booth (politician) (1926–1988), New South Wales politician

See also
 Ken Boothe (born 1948), Jamaican recording artist